Brigadier-General Sir Dalrymple Arbuthnot, 5th Baronet, CMG, DSO, JP (1 April 1867 – 31 March 1941) was a British baronet and Army officer.

Early life
The second son of Sir William Arbuthnot, 3rd Baronet and Alice Margaret Thompson, and younger brother of the 4th Baronet, he served at the Royal Military Academy Woolwich.

Military career
Arbuthnot was commissioned in the Royal Artillery on 17 February 1886. He served in the Chitral Expedition of 1895 in the North-West Frontier Province, where he was awarded a medal with clasp, and the following year was promoted to captain on 30 September 1896. He later served in the Second Boer War in South Africa from 1899 to 1902, being mentioned in despatches. He was promoted to major on 28 October 1901, and in January the following year was appointed an assistant staff officer for colonial forces in South Africa. After the end of the war in June 1902, Arbuthnot stayed in South Africa for several months, returning home on the SS Scot in November. 

By the time the First World War broke out he had risen to Lieutenant-Colonel and was Officer Commanding of the 44th (Howitzer) Brigade Royal Field Artillery, based at Brighton. On mobilisation, the Brigade formed part of the artillery of the 2nd Division in the original British Expeditionary Force. Arbuthnot commanded the Brigade until May 1915, when he became Commander Royal Artillery of the newly formed 28th Division. Although the Division spent only ten months on the Western Front before re-deploying to Salonika, it took part in several engagements at Second Battle of Ypres and in the Battle of Loos.

Arbuthnot spent much of the rest of the war away from the Western Front. He was Brigadier General, Royal Artillery of the XII Corps at Salonika from January to July 1916, Commander Royal Artillery of the 23rd Division in France and Italy from January 1917 to July 1918, and Brigadier General, Royal Artillery of the XXIII Corps, Home Forces, from July 1918 to the Armistice. In World War I, he collected two medals and five clasps, being mentioned in despatches eight times, and being brevetted to command of the XII Corps in 1916. In the first years of the Second World War, he served with the Civil Defence.

Arbuthnot was honoured by the Crown with the title of Companion of The Most Distinguished Order of St Michael and St George (CMG) in 1915 and was awarded the Distinguished Service Order (DSO). He was also a member of the Italian Order of Saints Maurice and Lazarus. and was made an Honorary Brigadier-General in 1920. Also had been a Justice of Peace for Shropshire, he succeeded to his brother's baronetcy on 31 May 1916, when his brother was killed in the battle of Jutland.

Family
On 15 January 1918, he married Alice Maud Arbuthnot, daughter of Hugh Lyttleton Arbuthnot. They had two children:

Major Sir Robert Dalrymple Arbuthnot, 6th Baronet (1919–1944)
Sir Hugh FitzGerald Arbuthnot, 7th Baronet (1922–1983)

Notes

References

Burke's Peerage & Baronetage 1975 107th ed.

External links

1867 births
1941 deaths
British Army brigadiers
Graduates of the Royal Military Academy, Woolwich
Dalrymple Arbuthnot
Baronets in the Baronetage of the United Kingdom
Royal Artillery officers
British military personnel of the Chitral Expedition
British Army personnel of the Second Boer War
British Army generals of World War I
Companions of the Distinguished Service Order
Companions of the Order of St Michael and St George
Recipients of the Order of Saints Maurice and Lazarus